This is a list of fossiliferous stratigraphic units in Cape Verde.



See also 
 Lists of fossiliferous stratigraphic units in Africa
 Geology of Cape Verde

References

Further reading 
 

Cape Verde
 
Cape Verde
Cape Verde geography-related lists
Fossil